Warren Township is an inactive township in Marion County, in the U.S. state of Missouri.

Warren Township was established in 1831, and named after Joseph Warren, perhaps via Warren County, Kentucky.

References

Townships in Missouri
Townships in Marion County, Missouri